Reginald Long can refer to:

 Reginald Long, British screenwriter and actor
 Reginald "Reggie" Long, a fictional character from DC Comics, the second Rorschach